WMIX-FM 94.1 FM is a radio station broadcasting a country music format. Licensed to Mount Vernon, Illinois, the station serves the areas of Mount Vernon, Illinois; Du Quoin, Illinois; Centralia, Illinois; and Flora, Illinois; and is owned by Withers Broadcasting, through Withers Broadcasting Company of Illinois, LLC.

References

External links
WMIX's webpage

MIX